The Sylacauga meteorite fell on November 30, 1954, at 12:46 local time (18:46 UT) in Oak Grove, Alabama, near Sylacauga, in the United States. It is also commonly called the Hodges meteorite because a fragment of it struck Ann Elizabeth Fowler Hodges (1920–1972).

Importance
The grapefruit-sized fragment crashed through the roof of a farm house, bounced off a large wooden console radio, and hit Hodges while she napped on a couch. The 34-year-old woman was badly bruised on one side of her body, but was able to walk and able to take photos showing the fresh wound.

The earliest claim of a person being hit by a meteorite comes from 1677 in a manuscript published at Tortona, Italy, which tells of a Milanese friar who was killed by one, although its veracity is unknown. The Tunguska event in 1908 is reported to have caused three casualties. In 1992 a small meteorite fragment (3 g) hit a young Ugandan boy in Mbale; it had been slowed by a tree and caused no injury.

On the night of October 3, 2021, a meteorite fell through the roof of a house in Golden, British Columbia, landing on a sleeping woman's pillow, but without harming her.

Fireball 
The meteor made a fireball visible from three American states as it streaked through the atmosphere, even though it fell early in the afternoon. There were also indications of an air blast, as witnesses described hearing "explosions or loud booms".

Following events 
The meteorite was confiscated by the Sylacauga police chief, who then turned it over to the United States Air Force. Both the Hodgeses and their landlord, Bertie Guy, claimed ownership of the rock, Guy's claim being that it had fallen on her property. The Hodgeses and Guy settled, with the Hodgeses paying $500 for the rock. However, by the time it was returned to the Hodgeses, over a year later, public attention had diminished, and they were unable to then find a buyer.

Ann Hodges was uncomfortable with the public attention and the stress of the dispute over ownership of the meteorite. The Hodgeses donated it to the Alabama Museum of Natural History in 1956.

The day after the fall, local farmer Julius McKinney came upon the second-largest fragment from the same meteorite. An Indianapolis-based lawyer bought it for the Smithsonian Institution. The McKinney family was able to use the money to buy a car and a house.

Fragments 
Upon the entry into the atmosphere, the Sylacauga meteorite fragmented into at least 3 pieces:
 The Hodges fragment – ) struck Ann Elizabeth Hodges.
 The McKinney fragment – ) was found the next day December 1, 1954, by Julius Kempis McKinney.
 A third fragment is believed to have struck the Earth somewhere near Childersburg (a few km north-west of Oak Grove).

Classification 
The Sylacauga meteorite is classified as an ordinary chondrite of H4 group.

Orbit 
The meteoroid came in on the sunward side of the Earth, so when it hit, it had passed the perihelion and was traveling outward from the Sun. Considering the orbit estimations, the best candidate as parent body is 1685 Toro.

See also
 Glossary of meteoritics

References

External links 
 University of Alabama News: 50th Anniversary of Hodges Meteorite
 National Geographic: The True Story of History's Only Known Meteorite Victim

1954 in science
1954 in the United States
Geology of Alabama
Meteorites found in the United States